James Young (10 January 1882 – 4 September 1922) was a Scottish football player, best known for playing as a right half for the highly successful Celtic side of the early 1900s. Young helped Celtic to win fifteen major trophies in total, comprising nine league championships and six Scottish Cups. His career was ended by a knee injury suffered in 1916.

Young made one appearance for the Scotland national football team, against Ireland in 1906. He also represented the Scottish League XI six times.

He died in a motorcycle accident in his native Ayrshire, aged 40.

In October 2013, a biography "Sunny Jim Young - Celtic Legend" written by David W. Potter was published.

Honours
Celtic
Scottish League: 1904–05, 1905–06, 1906–07, 1907–08, 1908–09, 1909–10, 1913–14, 1914–15, 1915–16
Scottish Cup: 1903–04, 1906–07, 1907–08, 1910–11, 1911–12, 1913–14
Glasgow Cup: 1904–05, 1905–06, 1906–07, 1907–08, 1909–10, 1915–16

References 

1882 births
1922 deaths
Footballers from Kilmarnock
Scottish footballers
Scotland international footballers
Bristol Rovers F.C. players
Celtic F.C. players
Southern Football League players
Scottish Junior Football Association players
Scottish Football League players
Scottish Football League representative players
Kilmarnock F.C. players
Barrow A.F.C. players
Motorcycle road incident deaths
Road incident deaths in Scotland
Association football wing halves